Kristian Ystaas (born 18 February 1982) is a strong  football striker currently playing for Sola FK. He most notably played for Sogndal and Brann in the Norwegian Premier League.

He had had problems with gaining a regular spot on the Brann team, and in 2005 he was loaned out to his old club Sogndal in the Norwegian First Division where he did not follow up the expectations. Back in Bergen, the competition was hard, and was ranked behind Bengt Sæternes, Robbie Winters, Charlie Miller and Migen Memelli. Ystaas played in the 2006-07 Royal League matches, before he decided to leave the club after his contract expired after the 2006 season. He chose Notodden FK, coached by his former boss in Sogndal, Jan Halvor Halvorsen. Ystaas played 31 matches for Brann, scoring 7 goals.

Ystaas joined Third Division club Sola FK ahead of the 2012 season.

Honors

Norway 
Norwegian Cup: 2004

References

1982 births
Living people
People from Voss
People from Arendal
Norwegian footballers
Sogndal Fotball players
SK Brann players
Notodden FK players
Sola FK players
Eliteserien players
Norwegian First Division players
Association football forwards
Sportspeople from Agder